Artocarpus rubrovenia is a species of plant in the family Moraceae. It is endemic to the Philippines. It is threatened by habitat loss. The species was first described in 1904.

References

Flora of the Philippines
rubrovenia
Vulnerable plants
Taxonomy articles created by Polbot
Taxobox binomials not recognized by IUCN